The Pârâul Țigăncilor is a left tributary of the river Siret in Romania. It flows into the Siret in Alexandru Ioan Cuza.

References

Rivers of Romania
Rivers of Iași County